The Snows of Kilimanjaro is a 2011 French drama film directed by Robert Guédiguian. It premiered in the Un Certain Regard section at the 2011 Cannes Film Festival. It won the audience award and the Silver Spike at the Valladolid International Film Festival.

Plot
Michel (Jean-Pierre Darroussin), lives happily with Marie-Claire (Ariane Ascaride), his wife of nearly 30 years. A dedicated shop steward for CGT (General Confederation of Labour), he is charged with calling out the names in a draw in the shipyard to select who will be the 20 workers which it has been agreed will be made redundant. Though he did not need to place his own name in the draw, he did so and it is drawn, and so he becomes one of the two losing their jobs.

His fellow workers and his family organize a party for his 30th wedding anniversary and present he and his wife with travel money and a ticket to Tanzania so they can climb Mount Kilimanjaro, singing the 1960s hit song "Kilimandjaro". Raoul (Gérard Meylan), Michel's brother-in-law, workmate and fellow trade union official presents him with a treasured but long-lost comic book from Michel's childhood, which Raoul says he found in a secondhand bookshop.

Before they leave for their holiday, Michel and Marie-Claire are playing cards at home with Raoul and Raoul's wife, Denise (Marilyne Canto) and are brutally robbed by two men  of the comic book and other possessions. Michel is injured while Denise becomes seriously disturbed from the trauma.

On a bus, Michel sees two children reading the stolen comic book. Following them, he recognises their older brother Christophe (Grégoire Leprince-Ringuet) as one of his fellow redundant workers. He identifies Christophe to the police and watches his arrest. Gradually, Michel and Marie-Claire discover that Christophe is caring for his two younger brothers, neglected for years by their mother.

Michel has second thoughts and wants to withdraw his accusation, but the case cannot be withdrawn. In the spirit of his hero, the French socialist leader Jean Jaurès, he decides to try to help the two younger brothers, only to discover that Marie-Claire has beaten him to it and is already secretly taking care of the children. They realise that it is their shared ideals that cement their relationship and, after arguments with their own, grown-up, children and with Raoul, they take the two boys into their home to look after them while their brother serves a long sentence. Raoul admits that he didn't find the comic book in a secondhand bookshop at all, but had stolen it from Michel when they were children.

Cast
 Ariane Ascaride as Marie-Claire
 Jean-Pierre Darroussin as Michel
 Gérard Meylan as Raoul
 Marilyne Canto as Denise
 Grégoire Leprince-Ringuet as Christophe
 Anaïs Demoustier as Flo
 Robinson Stévenin as Commissioner
 Adrien Jolivet as Gilles
 Karole Rocher as Christophe's Mother
 Julie-Marie Parmentier as Agnès
 Pierre Niney as Waiter

Story and title
The story, written by director Robert Guédiguian and Jean-Louis Milesi, takes its inspiration from the poem Les pauvres gens [Poor People] (How Good Are The Poor) one of the best known of Victor Hugo's poems from his three-volume poetry collection, La Légende des siècles (The Legend of the Centuries).

The title, on the other hand, is taken from the name of the song the main characters' family sings in the film: Pascal Danel's song "Kilimandjaro", known in French as Les Neiges du Kilimandjaro (The Snows of Kilimanjaro).

Critical response 
On Rotten Tomatoes, the film holds a rating of 100% based on 20 reviews, with an average rating of 7.17/10.

Accolades

See also
 The Snows of Kilimanjaro (disambiguation)

References

External links
 
 
 

2011 films
2011 drama films
2010s French-language films
French drama films
Films set in the 21st century
Films directed by Robert Guédiguian
Films set in Marseille
Films shot in France
Films based on works by Victor Hugo
Films about the labor movement
2010s French films